Stewart Brewing is an independent craft brewery based on the outskirts of Edinburgh in Loanhead, Midlothian, Scotland. It was established in 2004 by Steve and Jo Stewart.

It produces beer in small batches, which are available in approximately 200 real ale pubs in Edinburgh, the Lothians, Fife, the Borders, Glasgow and Newcastle. It also sells mini casks and bottled beers from its brewery shop. There is also a tasting room in Leith.

Stewart Brewing also has a range of canned and bottled beers, launched at the end of 2009.

References

External links
 

Breweries in Scotland
Companies established in 2004
Loanhead